Briarcliffe College was a private for-profit college with two campuses on Long Island, New York. It was owned by Career Education Corporation.  The Bethpage campus served Nassau County, New York, and the Patchogue campus was in Suffolk County, New York.  The college offered associate or bachelor programs.  It stopped accepting new students in 2015 and closed in 2018, citing financial difficulties, following a $10.25 million settlement with the New York state attorney general's office over inflated job placement rates in 2013.

History
Briarcliffe was founded in 1966, as a one-year business school in Hicksville, New York.  A branch campus opened in 1969 in Mineola/Garden City. This branch was moved to Lynbrook, New York in 1983. In 1979, the New York State Education Department authorized Briarclffe to offer the two-year associate degree in occupational studies. A third campus was established in Patchogue, New York in 1981.

In 1992, Briarcliffe, which had an overwhelmingly female student population, purchased Grumman Data Systems Institute, a technical school with a predominantly male enrollment.  The combination of the two institutions created a coeducational college of approximately 2,000 students.  The main campus was moved from Hicksville to the Grumman campus in Woodbury, New York.

In 1994, the school was granted regional accreditation by the Commission on Higher Education of the Middle States Association of Colleges and Schools. Students from the Lynbrook and Woodbury campuses were moved to this new main campus beginning with the fall semester in 1997.

In 1996, Briarcliffe become regionally accredited and the school and faculty earned the right to be called Briarcliffe "College".  One year later, the college became a 4-year college able to grant baccalaureate degrees. It was purchased by and is a subsidiary of Career Education Corporation.

In 2010, the college offered its first degree programs fully online.  Five years later, the college announced that it was no longer accepting new students and would be closed on December 31, 2018.

Accreditation
Briarcliffe College was regionally accredited by the Commission on Higher Education of the Middle States Association of Colleges and Schools. Individual programs at Briarcliffe College were programmatically accredited by additional agencies.

Athletics
Briarcliffe College eliminated all intercollegiate athletics in the 2015–2016 school year

The Briarcliffe Seahawks baseball program won three USCAA National Championships (2006, 2010 and 2011) and had multiple top 4 finishes throughout the decade. The baseball program was led by head coach Gary Puccio, Assistant Coach Enver Lopez, and former player turned coach Justin Mckay. Mckay would go on to become the head coach at Fairleigh Dickinson University, making him one of the youngest NCAA Division 1 baseball head coaches in the nation.

The Seahawks baseball program was led by standouts Justin Mckay, Drew Raschen, Danny O’Brien, Franklin Reyes, Baldwin Vargas, Scott Rader, Matthew Antonacci, John Rivera, Francis Santos, Danny Rodriguez, Jason Castillo, James Aspenleiter, Lee (Canada) Ranta, Reggie Smith & Matt Gelormino.

Briarcliffe Baseball also made two NJCAA Division 1 World Series appearances before moving to the USCAA.

References

External links
 Official website

 
Educational institutions established in 1974
Defunct private universities and colleges in New York (state)
Former for-profit universities and colleges in the United States
Graphic design schools in the United States
Universities and colleges on Long Island
Universities and colleges in Nassau County, New York
Universities and colleges in Suffolk County, New York
USCAA member institutions
1966 establishments in New York (state)
Long Island City
Career Education Corporation
Educational institutions disestablished in 2018
2018 disestablishments in New York (state)